SXSW V2V was an annual technology entrepreneurship conference, spun off from the South by Southwest conference, held from 2013 to 2015. It featured a startup competition, panel discussions, and mentoring workshops for entrepreneurs. Hosted in Las Vegas, it was the first SXSW event to take place outside of Austin, Texas.  It began as an evolution of the startup competition that is held as part of the SXSW Interactive festival each spring.

The after-hours schedule for the event included comedy, film, and music offerings.

About
The company said variously that V2V stands for "Vision to Venture", "Visionaries to Vegas", and “Voice to Voice", describing the focus of the conference on finding, financing, and developing new businesses. The conference started with the recognition that the three large spring festivals that SXSW, Inc. holds in Austin were straining the hotel capacity of that city.

V2Venture Competition

One of the main events was the V2Venture startup competition, where startup companies competed under five categories. Participating companies represented the fields of Culture and Education Technology, Education Technology, Health Technology, Innovative World Technologies, and Mobile and Tablet Technology.

Finalists
Trackster, the world's first studio network for the re-amping of guitar recordings, was a finalist in the "Culture and Entertainment Technology" category in 2013.

3DLT, a company that serves as a repository of 3D printing designs, was a finalist in the "Innovative World Technology" category in 2013, as was Cl3ver, a real time 3D engine to share interactive scenes on any online device.

Notable speakers
Speakers at the inaugural event included Zappos founder and CEO Tony Hsieh.

References

Recurring events established in 2013
Recurring events disestablished in 2015
Las Vegas Valley conventions and trade shows
Technology conferences
Computer conferences
Innovation organizations
2013 establishments in Nevada
2015 disestablishments in Nevada